Alexander Dunnett (November 29, 1852 - September 14, 1920) was an attorney and politician from Vermont.  A Republican, he was most notable for his service as State's Attorney of Caledonia County (1886-1890), a member of the Vermont Senate (1900-1901), and United States Attorney for the District of Vermont (1906-1915).

Early life
Alexander Dunnett was born in Peacham, Vermont on November 29, 1852, the son of Andrew and Christianne (Galbraith) Dunnett.  He was raised and educated in Peacham and Ryegate, and attended McIndoes Academy and Newbury Seminary.  While a teenager, Dunnett was working on a railroad construction crew when a large stone fell on him.  He sustained a crushed pelvis, and doctors feared he would not survive.  Dunnett recovered, but the effects of the injury resulted in a unique gait when he walked and the carrying of one shoulder lower than the other.  He graduated from the Randolph Normal School (now Vermont Technical College) in 1874, and taught school while studying law with attorney Nelson L. Boyden of Randolph.  Dunnett then attended courses at Boston University School of Law to complete his legal education, and attained admission to the bar in 1877.

Start of career
Dunnett practiced in Ryegate before relocating to St. Johnsbury, where he practiced law with various partners at different times, including Albro F. Nichols, Leighton P. Slack, Charles E. Leslie, and Charles A. Shields.

A Republican, while living in Ryegate, Dunnett served as school superintendent and town meeting moderator.  After moving to St. Johnsbury, he was chosen to moderate its town meeting for several years.  Dunnett served as State's Attorney for Caledonia County from 1896 to 1900.  In addition, he was the longtime chairman of the Caledonia County Republican Committee, and served as chairman of the Vermont Republican Party's 1900 convention.

Later career
From 1900 to 1901 he represented Caledonia County in the Vermont Senate.  From 1906 to 1915, Dunnett was United States Attorney for the District of Vermont.  He was President of the Vermont Bar Association from 1907 to 1908.

During the 1912 campaign for president, William Howard Taft campaigned in St. Johnsbury, and Dunnett was chosen to make the speech that introduced him.  In 1914, Dunnett was a candidate for the Republican U.S. House nomination in Vermont's 2nd District.  Porter H. Dale won on the 21st ballot at the state party convention, and went on to win the general election.  In 1916, Dunnett was an alternate delegate to the Republican National Convention.

Dunnett was a Freemason, and was also active as a Royal Arch Mason and a member of the Knights Templar.

Death and burial
Dunnett suffered from kidney disease in his later years, and became ill while attending the 1920 Republican National Convention, where he delivered a seconding speech in support of Calvin Coolidge for vice president.  He died at his summer home on Lake Groton in Groton, Vermont on September 14, 1920.  Dunnett was buried at Hillside Cemetery in Ryegate.

Honors
Dunnett was a longtime member of the Norwich University board of trustees, and vice president of the university corporation.  In 1917, NU awarded him the honorary degree of Master of Science.

Family
Dunnett was married three times.  In 1879, he married Ella J. White, who died in 1881.  In 1884, he married Sarah M. Town, who died in 1888.  In 1890, Dunnett married Ella Chalmers, the widow of Reverend John R. Chalmers of St. Johnsbury.  With his first wife, Dunnett was the father of son Jim A. Dunnett, who was born and died in 1881.

References

Sources

Newspapers

Books

External links

Alexander Dunnett at The Political Graveyard

1852 births
1920 deaths
People from St. Johnsbury, Vermont
Vermont lawyers
State's attorneys in Vermont
United States Attorneys for the District of Vermont
Republican Party Vermont state senators
Burials in Vermont
19th-century American lawyers